Juan Llort Corbella (born 27 May 1950, in Tarragona) is a sailor from Spain. Llort represented his country at the 1972 Summer Olympics in Kiel. Llort took 9th place in the Soling with Ramón Balcells Rodón as helmsman and Ramón Balcells as fellow crew member.

References

Living people
1950 births
Sportspeople from Tarragona
Spanish male sailors (sport)
Olympic sailors of Spain
Sailors at the 1972 Summer Olympics – Soling
Snipe class sailors